Glenfield railway station may refer to:

 Glenfield railway station (Leicestershire), England (closed)
 Glenfield railway station (Scotland), Renfrewshire (closed)
 Glenfield railway station, Sydney, Australia